The York Catholic District School Board (YCDSB, known as English-language Separate District School Board No. 42 prior to 1999) is the English-language public-separate school district authority for the Regional Municipality of York in Ontario, Canada. Its head office is in Aurora.

The YCDSB operates schools in each of the nine municipalities in York Region. It employs over 5,000 instructional staff to teach over 54,000 students in 85 elementary schools and 16 secondary schools. The school board until 1998 was originally known as the York Region Roman Catholic Separate School Board (YRRCSSB) as an anglophone/francophone school district.

Instructional services
The Instructional Services department is responsible for the development and delivery of the YCDSB curriculum, guided by the following criteria:

 religious education,
 alternative education,
 continuing education,
 co-operative education,
 student assessment, and
 equity in curriculum.

The 85 elementary schools are administered as part of an Elementary School Area; there are four areas in the school board. Each area is administered by a Superintendent of Education, and the schools are divided into two groups, each of which has a Trustee.

The 16 secondary schools are administered as a single group with two Superintendents of Education. Additionally, each school has at least one trustee, and each trustee may serve duties for one or more schools.

The department also has a Superintendent of Curriculum & Assessment and a Superintendent of Education & Student Services.

Secondary schools

Former Student Trustees

Alessandro Casbarro (2020-2022)
Teresa Siby (2019-2021)
Matthew Ho (2018-2020)
Sophia Trozzo (2017-2019)
Ben Smith (2016-2018)

See also

York Region District School Board
Conseil scolaire de district catholique Centre-Sud
Conseil scolaire Viamonde
Archdiocese of Toronto
Education in Ontario
List of school districts in Ontario
List of high schools in Ontario

References

External links

  York Catholic District School Board website

 
Roman Catholic Archdiocese of Toronto